Manochithra is a former Indian actress. She has appeared in Telugu, Tamil-language and Malayalam movies. She made her Malayalam debut with the movie Mazhanilavu in 1983 with Prem Nazir in the lead. She is the daughter of Tamil actor T. S. Balaiah and Mallika.

Filmography

References

External links

Actresses in Tamil cinema
Actresses in Malayalam cinema
Indian film actresses
Living people
Year of birth missing (living people)
Place of birth missing (living people)
20th-century Indian actresses
21st-century Indian actresses
Actresses in Telugu cinema